Kevin Thomas Anderson is a singer, songwriter and recording artist from Philadelphia, Pennsylvania. Known for his work in the adult pop genre, as well as his association with legendary Sigma Sound Studio engineers, Michael and Joseph Tarsia.

Career
Kevin produced one independent LP before teaming up with Grammy recognized producer, Michael Tarsia to release "Soul Food;" an album which explores several musical styles and is reminiscent of Philadelphia's Motown era. The album also features his eight piece band, The Stick Em Up Kids. In 2010, "Soul Food" was up for Grammy consideration in two categories; including "Best Pop Vocal Album" and "Best Engineered Album" .

Anderson has worked as a "ghost writer" with longtime writing partner & R&B singer, Nash; who in 2008 filed a lawsuit against Rodney Jerkins, Mary J. Blige, & Jay-Z for copyright infringement. According to the suit, Jermaine Jummp (aka Nash) and Michael Adams Jr. claim that the single,"Enough Cryin," from Mary J. Blige's 2005 album, "The Breakthrough", infringes their copyright in a song called "On My Grind."  Kevin has also written songs for dubstep/grime artist, Kate Marie and UK rapper, Fix Dot'm; as well as DJ L from Wyclef Jean's band "City High".

References

External links
Official website
Discogs.com
Miketarsia.com
Sigmasoundstudios.com

American singer-songwriters
American male singer-songwriters
Living people
Year of birth missing (living people)